Chandrodayapur  is a village development committee in Siraha District in the Sagarmatha Zone of south-eastern Nepal. At the time of the 2011 Nepal census it had a population of 5932 people living in 1123 individual households.

References

External links
UN map of the municipalities of  Siraha District

Populated places in Siraha District